Hammersmith station may refer to:
The following stations in Hammersmith, west London:
 Hammersmith tube station (District and Piccadilly lines), a London Underground station served by the District and Piccadilly lines
 Hammersmith tube station (Circle and Hammersmith & City lines), a London Underground station served by the Circle and Hammersmith & City lines
 Hammersmith (Grove Road) railway station, a former station that closed in 1916
Hammersmith railway station in Hammersmith, Derbyshire
Hammersmith and Chiswick railway station, a former station located in Chiswick that closed to passengers in 1917 and to goods in 1965.